Tulketh Mill is an Edwardian former cotton-spinning mill in Balcarres Road, Tulketh, Preston, Lancashire, England. It was designed by Fred Dixon of Oldham and built for the Tulketh Spinning Company in 1905. It is a grade II listed building.  The building currently houses contact centres and offices for Capita, Dixons Carphone and Hinduja Global Solutions.

Talketh Mill, Water Lane

An earlier Talketh Mill stood in Water Lane, Preston, until it was destroyed by fire in June 1883.

See also
 List of mills in Preston

References

External links 

Grade II listed buildings in Lancashire
Buildings and structures in Preston
Industrial buildings in England
Buildings and structures completed in 1905
Fred Dixon buildings
Tulketh
1905 establishments in England